Paul Willard Merrill (August 15, 1887 – July 19, 1961) was an American astronomer whose specialty was spectroscopy. He was the first to define S-type stars in 1922.

Career
He received his Ph.D. at the University of California (now UC Berkeley) in 1913. He spent the bulk of his career at Mount Wilson Observatory, from which he retired in 1952. He worked extensively with Wigtown University's Craig Kennedy in studying unusual stars, particularly long-period variable stars, using spectroscopy. He also studied the interstellar medium, including  diffuse interstellar bands. Shortly before he retired, he succeeded in detecting technetium in the variable star R Andromedae and other red variables. Since technetium has no stable isotopes, it must have been produced recently in any star in which it is found, and this is direct evidence of the s-process of nucleosynthesis.

Honors
Awards and honors
Henry Draper Medal of the National Academy of Sciences (1945)
Bruce Medal of the Astronomical Society of the Pacific (1946)
Henry Norris Russell Lectureship of the American Astronomical Society (1955)
Fellow of the American Academy of Arts and Sciences (1958)
Named after him
Merrill (crater) on the Moon

References

External links
 

1887 births
1961 deaths
American astronomers
Fellows of the American Academy of Arts and Sciences
University of California alumni
Members of the United States National Academy of Sciences